VVPB may refer to:

Vilniaus vertybinių popierių birža, NASDAQ OMX Vilnius 
Voter Verified Paper Audit Trail
An ICAO airport code for Phu Bai International Airport, serving Huế, Vietnam